Alpine speedwell is a common name for several plants and may refer to:

Veronica alpina, native to Europe, Asia, and North America
Veronica wormskjoldii, native to North America